St Nicholas Grammar School was a grammar school, located in Northwood Hills, in the London Borough of Hillingdon, Middlesex. In 1977, it joined with the neighbouring St. Mary's Grammar School for Girls to form Haydon School.

History
Approval to begin construction of St Nicholas Grammar School was granted on 11 May 1953, and the work was undertaken by the construction firm of Holland, Hannen & Cubitts.

In 1954, two forms were established at Bourne Secondary Modern to become the nucleus of pupils, forming 2a and 2b at the new building in 1955.

The grammar school opened in 1955, and ran for 22 years. Its crest was a bishop's mitre surrounded by three money bags. The first headmaster was Dr. Robert Watson (8 March 1910 - 16 July 2004), who assembled the teaching staff during the late winter and early spring of 1955. He held the position until retiring at the end of term 1975.

Robert Watson was succeeded by Leslie Shearn who guided the school through amalgamation with the adjacent girls' school. In 1978, Haydon School changed the crest to a stylized stag's head.

Houses
There were four houses; each with its own staff. Abbotts, which was red, Bec, which was yellow, Kevere, which was green, and Kings, which was blue. The houses were named after local landowners: Abbots was named after the Abbots of Bec, who owned the Abbey of Bec and its estates from about 1090. Two abbots became Archbishops of Canterbury. A later Abbot, Gundulf, was responsible for the building of the keep of the Tower of London. Bec house was named after the Abbey of St Mary Bec, founded in about 1040. Its connections with the area began about 1090 when one Ernulf of Hesdin left all his lands, including the manor of Ruislip, to the abbey. The estate was managed by the prior of Ogbourne who owed allegiance to the Abbot of Bec.

A House Assembly was held once per week, on Friday. Each house had its own colours. There were many inter-house competitions throughout the school year, the emphasis being on field sports, though there were also drama, chess and art competitions.

Facilities
There was a language laboratory, senior and junior science laboratories for chemistry and physics, a school orchestra, a library, workshops for metalwork and woodwork, and several pitches for games. The playing field was shared with St. Mary's Grammar School for Girls.

Notable alumni
 Felix Dennis — publisher. Originally of Oz magazine fame
 Jake Riviera - (born Andrew Jakeman) rock n' roll manager. (Elvis Costello, Nick Lowe), co-founder of Stiff Records
 John Henderson — film and TV director. Credits include The Borrowers and Spitting Image
 Tony Hymas — musician/arranger. Worked with Jeff Beck and others for many years
 Baron Rosser — trade union leader. General Secretary of the TSSA from 1989 to 2004
 Gary Tibbs — musician and actor. Played bass guitar with The Vibrators, Roxy Music and  Adam and The Ants
 Stuart Baird - Film editor (The Omen) and later film production and communications. Contemporary and friend of Felix Dennis.

References
 
 
 
 

Defunct schools in the London Borough of Hillingdon
Defunct grammar schools in England
Educational institutions established in 1955
Educational institutions disestablished in 1977
1955 establishments in England
1977 disestablishments in England